is one of the Expressways of Japan from Yatsushiro to  Kagoshima linking with the Kyushu Expressway.  It runs through the southern half of Kumamoto prefecture, and the northern half of the Kagoshima prefecture. The total length is 140 km.

Overview 
The first section of the expressway was opened to traffic in 1988. As of March 2007 the expressway incomplete in many areas. The next sections are scheduled to open in 2009 (Tanoura Interchange to Ashikita Interchange). After this, Most of the incomplete areas will be built according to the New Direct Control System, whereby the burden for construction costs will be shared by the national and local governments and no tolls will be collected. Currently the section between Hinagu Interchange and Tsunagi Interchange, Noda Interchange and Akune Interchange, and Satsumasendai-Mizuhiki Interchange and Ichiki Interchange operates according to this principle.

The route parallels the Kagoshima Main Line of Kyushu Railway Company and National Route 3 for much of its length.

History
October 19, 1988, a section from Kagoshima-nishi to Kagoshima Interchange was opened to traffic.
March 26, 1998, a section from Ijuin to Kagoshima-nishi Interchanges was opened to traffic.
April 20, 1998, a section from Yatsushiro Junction to Yatsushiro-minami Interchange was opened to traffic.
October 6, 2001, a section from Yatsushiro-minami to Hinagu Interchange was opened to traffic.
April 6, 2002, a section from Ichiki to Ijuin Interchanges was opened to traffic.
February 27, 2005, a section from Hinagu to Tanoura Interchange was opened to traffic.
March 13, 2005, a section from Kushikino to Ichiki Interchange was opened to traffic.
March 3, 2007, a section from Satsumasendai-Miyako to Kushikino Interchange was opened to traffic.
March 31, 2008, the Miyama Interchange was opened.
April 29, 2009, a section from Tanoura to Ashikita Interchange was opened to traffic.
March 10, 2013, a section from Satsumasendai-Mizuhiki to Satsumasendai-Takae Interchange was opened to traffic.
March 7, 2015, a section from Satsumasendai-Takae to Satsumasendai-Miyako Interchange was opened to traffic.
March 29, 2015, a section from Akune-kita to Akune Interchange was opened to traffic.
December 19, 2015, a section from Noda to Akune-kita Interchange was opened to traffic.
February 27, 2016, a section from Ashikita to Tsunagi Interchange was opened to traffic.
March 11, 2017, a section from Tanaono-kita to Noda Interchange was opened to traffic.
November 12, 2017, a section from Izumi to Tanaono-kita Interchange was opened to traffic.
March 2, 2019, a section from Tsunagi to Minamata Interchange was opened to traffic.

Interchanges 

 IC - interchange, JCT - junction, SA - service area, PA - parking area, BS - bus stop, TN - tunnel, BR - bridge, TB - toll gate
 Bus stops labeled "○" are currently in use; those marked "◆" are closed.

Lanes
2-lane

See also
Kyushu Expressway
Japan National Route 3
Kagoshima Main Line
West Nippon Expressway Company

Expressways in Japan
Roads in Kagoshima Prefecture
Roads in Kumamoto Prefecture
Minami Kyushu Expressway